Le Palais du Peyrou (Peyrou Palace) is a mansion in the city of Neuchâtel.

The relatively large Swiss mansion was built between 1765 and 1771 for Pierre-Alexandre Du Peyrou (1729–1794) by the Bernese architect Erasme Ritter (1726–1805). The still mainly original interior of the mansion was executed by highly skilled craftsmen. The faience stoves were delivered by the Frisching Faience Manufactory from Bern.

Du Peyrou was immensely rich. His fortune derived from his two plantations in Suriname where he was born and where his father was in a high position within the Court of Justice. Du Peyrou was a close friend of Jean-Jacques Rousseau. It was Du Peyrou who paid the costs for the first publishing of the complete works of Jean-Jacques Rousseau in 1788 in Geneva.

Du Peyrou and his wife, Henriette Dorothée de Pury (1750–1818), had no children. In 1799 the mansion was sold to Frédéric de Pourtalès. Afterwards the mansion changed hands several times. In 1858 the city of Neuchâtel bought the mansion and restored it to its former glory. Today Le Palais du Peyrou contains a restaurant and it is also used for ceremonial events by the city.

References
Notes

Literature and external links
Charly Guyot, Un ami et défenseur de Rousseau: Pierre-Alexandre Du Peyrou, Neuchâtel, Ides et Calendes, 1958
Walter A. Staehelin: Keramische Forschungen aus bernischen Archiven. In: Keramikfreunde der Schweiz: Mitteilungsblatt. Nr. 81 (1970), S. 3–34.
Robert L. Wyss: Kachelöfen, in: Bern und die bildenden Künste, in: Illustrierte Berner Enzyklopädie, Bd. IV. Kunst und Kultur im Kanton Bern, Bern 1987, S. 107–109.
Website Hôtel Du Peyrou
Luxury Dream Villas

Villas in Switzerland
Buildings and structures in the canton of Neuchâtel
Houses completed in 1771
18th-century architecture in Switzerland